Ariyur is a village in the Annavasal   revenue block of Pudukkottai district, Tamil Nadu, India.

Demographics 
As per the 2011 census, Ariyur had a total population of 1194  with 645 males and 549 females. The literacy rate was 70.53%

References 

Villages in Pudukkottai district